Kukatja, Kukatj, Kokatja or  Gugadja  may refer to one of several Australian Aboriginal peoples or their languages:

Kukatj people of Queensland
Kukatj language
Kukatja  (Western Australia) people
Kukatja language (two dialects, same name)
Luritja people of the Northern Territory
Luritja language

More unusually:
Kokatha people of South Australia (Kokatja is the Yankuntjatjarra pronunciation)
Kokatha language

Language and nationality disambiguation pages